Rowan D. Wilson (born September 3, 1960) is an American judge who has served as an Associate Judge of the New York Court of Appeals since 2017.

Wilson was born in Pomona, California, and grew up in Berkeley, California. He studied at Harvard College, and graduated from Harvard Law School in 1984.

After serving a two-year term as law clerk to James R. Browning, Chief Judge of the United States Court of Appeals for the Ninth Circuit, he joined Cravath, Swaine & Moore as an associate in 1986. In 1992, he became the first African-American partner at Cravath. He remained a litigation partner until 2017, with a practice that included antitrust, intellectual property, securities fraud, and civil rights litigation.

He was nominated as an Associate Judge of the New York Court of Appeals by Governor Andrew Cuomo on January 15, 2017, and confirmed by the New York State Senate on February 6, 2017.

References

1960 births
21st-century American judges
Harvard College alumni
Harvard Law School alumni
Judges of the New York Court of Appeals
Living people
New York (state) Democrats
People from Pomona, California